A uvular–epiglottal consonant is a doubly articulated consonant pronounced by making a simultaneous uvular consonant and epiglottal consonant. An example is the Somali "uvular" plosive , which is a voiceless uvular–epiglottal plosive , as in  'to emit smoke'.

References 

Place of articulation
Uvular consonants
Epiglottal consonants
Doubly articulated consonant